Udo Proksch (29 May 1934 in Rostock, Germany – 27 June 2001 in Graz, Austria) was an Austrian businessman and industrialist. In 1991, he was convicted of the murder of six people as part of a major insurance fraud. Proksch died in prison.

Lucona sinking
In 1977, the ship Lucona sank in the Indian Ocean, after an explosion, killing six people. Proksch, the owner of the cargo, also then owner of famous Viennese confectioners' Demel, claimed US$20 million from his insurance company, saying that the ship was carrying expensive uranium mining equipment. Fraud was suspected; but investigations were obstructed by powerful Austrian politicians who were friends of Proksch.

In 1988, Proksch fled to the Philippines after Hans Pretterebner published a book about the scandal.

In 1989, he returned to Vienna, incognito, but was recognized and arrested. In 1990, Lucona was located by American shipwreck hunter David Mearns, who discovered that the ship had been sunk by a time bomb. 

On March 11, 1991, Proksch was sentenced to 20 years in prison. A year later, the sentence was increased to a lifelong term in prison. Several ex-Ministers were also eventually convicted over their involvement. The ex-Minister of Foreign Affairs was sentenced for forging documents authenticating the cargo. Two other Ministers were dismissed for obstructing the investigations. The Minister of Defense Karl Lütgendorf, a shareholder in the Proksch firm, had given permission to deliver explosives to sabotage the ship and committed suicide when that became clear.

Proksch died on 27 June 2001, during heart surgery.

Proksch was the first husband of the actress Daphne Wagner, daughter of Wieland Wagner, great-granddaughter of the composer Richard Wagner and great-great-granddaughter of Franz Liszt.

Works about Proksch and the Lucona case
1988: Hans Pretterebner publishes a book about the Lucona case, Der Fall Lucona.
1993: , a film about the Lucona case (starring David Suchet).
2004: The art group monochrom stages Udo 77, a musical about the life of Udo Proksch.
2010: A documentary about Proksch, entitled Udo Proksch: Out of Control and directed by Robert Dornhelm is released.

See also
 Proksch

Notes and references

External links
 Netcyclo: Austrian history 1983 onwards
 IMDb entry about 'Der Fall Lucona'
 Homepage of 'Udo 77' (German language)

1934 births
2001 deaths
Wagner family
Austrian mass murderers
Austrian people who died in prison custody
Austrian prisoners sentenced to life imprisonment
Bombers (people)
Prisoners sentenced to life imprisonment by Austria
Prisoners who died in Austrian detention
Austrian people convicted of murder
People convicted of murder by Austria
Austrian people of German descent
People from Rostock